The syncretistic controversy was the theological debate provoked by the efforts of Georg Calixt and his supporters to secure a basis on which the Lutherans could make overtures to the Roman Catholic and the Reformed Churches. It lasted from 1640 to 1686.

Acquaintance to different religious bodies
Calixt, a professor at Helmstedt, had through his travels in England, the Netherlands, Italy, and France, through his acquaintance with the different Churches and their representatives, and through his extensive study, developed a more friendly attitude towards the different religious bodies than the majority of his contemporary Lutheran theologians.

Doctrinal minimalism
While the latter firmly adhered to the "pure doctrine," Calixt tended not to regard doctrine as the one thing necessary for a Christian; while in doctrine itself he did not regard everything as equally certain and important. Consequently, he advocated unity between those who agreed on the fundamental minimum, with liberty as to all less fundamental points. In regard to Catholicism, he would have (as Melanchthon once would have) conceded to the pope a primacy human in origin, and he also admitted that one might call the Mass a sacrifice.

Academic theology
On the side of Calixt stood the theological faculties of Helmstedt, Rinteln, and Königsberg; opposed to him stood those of Leipzig, Jena, Strasburg, Giessen, Marburg, and Greifswald. Abraham Calov in especial opposed Calixt.

Elector of Saxony
The Elector of Saxony, for political reasons, opposed the Reformed Church, because the other two secular electors (Palatine and Brandenburg) were Reformed, and were getting more and more the advantage of him. In 1649 he sent to the three dukes of Brunswick, who maintained Helmstedt as their common university, a communication in which he voiced all the objections of his Lutheran professors, and complained that Calixt wished to extract the elements of truth from all religions, fuse all into an entirely new religion, and so provoke a violent schism.

Professor at Wittenberg
In 1650, Calov became a professor at Wittenberg, and he signalized his entrance into office with a vehement attack on the Syncretists in Helmstedt. An outburst of polemical writings followed. In 1650 the dukes of Brunswick answered the Elector of Saxony that the discord should not be allowed to increase, and proposed a meeting of the political councillors. Saxony, however, did not favour this suggestion. An attempt to convene a meeting of theologians was not more successful. The theologians of Wittenberg and Leipzig now elaborated a new formula, condemning  ninety-eight heresies of the Helmstedt theologians. This formula (consensus) was to be signed by everyone who wished to remain in the Lutheran Church. Outside Wittenberg and Leipzig, however, it was not accepted, and Calixt's death in 1656 ushered in five years of almost undisturbed peace.

Strife in Hesse-Kassel
The strife broke out afresh in Hesse-Kassel, where Landgrave William VI sought to effect a union between his Lutheran and Reformed subjects, or at least to lessen their mutual hatred. In 1661 he had a colloquy held in Kassel between the Lutheran theologians of the University of Rinteln and the Reformed theologians of the University of Marburg. Enraged at this revival of the syncretism of Calixt, the Wittenberg theologians in vehement terms called on the Rinteln professors to make their submission, whereupon the latter answered with a detailed defence. Another long series of polemical treatises followed.

Disputes between Evangelical bodies
In Brandenburg-Prussia the "Great Elector" (Frederick William I) forbade (1663) preachers to speak of the disputes between the Evangelical bodies. A long colloquy in Berlin (September 1662 to May 1663) led only to fresh discord. The Elector, however, grew impatient with a lack of success at his conferences. He put an end to them in 1664 and published another "syncretistic" edict. Since the edict disallowed the Formula of Concord, one of the Lutheran Confessions as contained in the Book of Concord of 1580, many Lutheran clergy could not bring themselves to comply with the edict.

Observing the syncretistic edict
Whoever refused to sign the form declaring his intention to observe this regulation was deprived of his position, including Paul Gerhardt, a pastor and noted hymnwriter. The citizens of Berlin petitioned to have him restored, and owing to their repeated requests an exception to the edict was made for Gerhardt, although his conscience did not allow him to retain a post which, appeared to him, could only be held on condition of a tacit repudiation of the Formula of Concord. For over a year he lived in Berlin without fixed employment. During this time his wife also died, leaving him with only one surviving child. Ironically, the edict was withdrawn a few months later, although by this time his patroness, Electress Louisa Henrietta had died and so he was still without a position.

Allegations of heresy
The attempts of the Wittenberg theologians to declare Calixt and his school un-Lutheran and heretical were now met by Calixt's son, Friedrich Ulrich Calixt, The latter defended the theology of his father, but also tried to show that his doctrine did not so very much differ from that of his opponents. Wittenberg found its new champion in Ægidius Strauch, who attacked Calixt with all the resources of learning, polemics, sophistry, wit, cynicism, and abuse. The Helmstedt side was defended by the celebrated scholar and statesman, Hermann Conring. The Saxon princes now recognized the danger that the attempt to carry through the "Consensus" as a formula of belief might lead to a fresh schism in the Lutheran Church, and might thus render its position difficult in the face of the Catholics.

Old Lutheran confession
The proposals of Calov and his party to continue the refutation and to compel the Brunswick theologians to bind themselves under obligation to the old Lutheran confession therefore remained unimplemented. On the contrary, the Saxon theologians were forbidden to continue the strife in writing. Negotiations for peace then resulted, with Duke Ernst the Pious of Saxe-Gotha  especially active towards this end, and the project of establishing a permanent college of theologians to decide theological disputes was entertained.

Negotiation with the courts
However, the negotiations with the courts of Brunswick, Mecklenburg, Denmark, and Sweden remained as fruitless as those with the theological faculties, except that peace was maintained until 1675. Calov then renewed hostilities. He now attacked not only Calixt, but also and particularly the moderate John Musæus of Jena. Calov succeeded in having the whole University of Jena (and after a long resistance Musæus himself) compelled to renounce syncretism. But this was his last victory. The elector renewed his prohibition against polemical writings.

Renewed attacks on syncretists
Calov seemed to give way, since in 1683 he asked whether, in the view of the danger which France then constituted for Germany, a Calixtinic Syncretism with "Papists" and the Reformed were still condemnable, and whether in deference to the Elector of Brandenburg and the dukes of Brunswick, the strife should not be buried by an amnesty, or whether, on the contrary, the war against syncretism should be continued. He later returned to his attack on the syncretists, but died in 1686, and with his death the strife ended.

Reduced religious hatred
The Syncretist Strife had the result of lessening religious hatred and of promoting mutual forbearance. Catholicism thus benefited, as Protestants came to better understand and appreciate it. In Protestant theology it prepared the way for the sentimental theology of Pietism to become more popular than orthodoxy. 

17th-century Lutheranism
Protestantism-related controversies
Religious syncretism